Edison Theater was a  movie theater, cultural center and concert venue in the Zichron Moshe neighborhood of Jerusalem. The theater opened in 1932 and closed down in 1995.

History
Edison Theater was the third movie theater built in Jerusalem. It was noted for its modern architecture and spaciousness. It could seat 1,500 people. It was also the city's first public auditorium with air conditioning. It was named for Thomas Edison, inventor of the motion picture. 

In addition to movies, many world-renowned artists performed there, including Yves Montand. It served as the concert venue for the pre-state Israel Philharmonic Orchestra.

The theater's location on the seamline between religious and secular Jewish neighborhoods in Jerusalem led to friction over the years. In 1931, the theater signed an "anti-Shabbat-violation" agreement together with the city's two other theaters. Violating the agreement would incur a fine of 300 Israeli liras. Later ticket sales commenced before the end of Shabbat, even though the screenings themselves were after Shabbat. The Haredi community, led by Amram Blau  of Neturei Karta, tried to stop this practice, and the theater was severely damaged in two arson attacks (in 1965 and 1975).

The theater closed in 1995 and was abandoned for a number of years. In 2006, the site was sold to a group of Satmar Hasidim ,spearheaded by two American businessmen,Benzion Wertzberger 
and Yitzchok Rosenberg,and built a 64-unit housing complex there, completed in February 2014.

See also
Cinema of Israel
Culture of Israel
Architecture of Israel

References

Buildings and structures in Jerusalem
Cinemas and movie theatres in Israel
Buildings and structures demolished in 2006
Demolished buildings and structures in Israel
Former theatres
Former cinemas